The discography of Spice 1 consists of 12 studio albums, one EP, 11 compilation albums and six charting singles.

Albums

Studio albums
  Haterz Nightmare Halloween Edition
| To Be Released October 31, 2021
|  Label Thug World Music Group
| Format: digital download

Collaboration albums
Criminal Activity with Criminalz (2001)
NTA: National Thug Association with Bad Boy (2003)
The Pioneers  with MC Eiht (2004)
Thug Lordz Trilogy with Thug Lordz (2006)
Keep It Gangsta  with MC Eiht (2006)
Criminal Intent with Jayo Felony (2007)
Thug Therapy with Bossolo (2015)

Compilation albums
Hits (1998)
The Playa Rich Project (2000)
Hits II: Ganked & Gaffled (2001)
The Playa Rich Project 2 (2002)
Hits 3 (2002)
Thug Disease (2002)
Bossed Out (2005)
The Thug In Me (2005)
Life After Jive: 2000 to 2005 (2006)
Thug Association (2007)
Thug Reunion (2008)

Extended plays

Guest appearances
1988: "Leave It to Me" (from The Dangerous Crew album Dangerous Crew)
1993: "Spice 1 wit da Banksta" (from the Ant Banks album Sittin' on Somethin' Phat)
1993: "The Dangerous Crew" (from the Too Short album Get in Where You Fit In)
1994: "Gangsta Team" (from the South Central Cartel album 'N Gatz We Truss)
1994: "2 Kill a G" (from the Ant Banks album The Big Badass)
1994: "Nigga Sings the Blues" (from Jason's Lyric)
1994: "Nuthin' but the Gangsta" (from the MC Eiht album We Come Strapped)
1994: "East Coast/West Coast" (from the Simplé E album Colouz Uv Sound)
1995: "Sound of Lead" (from the Ant Banks album Do or Die)
1995: "Born II Die" (from the Tales from the Hood)
1995: "Dusted N Disgusted" (from the E-40 album In a Major Way)
1995: "Trouble (Scared to Blast)" (from The Dangerous Crew album Don't Try This at Home)
1995: "No Peace", "Gun Smoke", "Pass da Dank" (from the South Central Cartel album Murder Squad Nationwide)
1996: "Slugs" (from Original Gangstas)
1996: "Red Rum" (from the Celly Cel album Killa Kali)
1996: "Check Ya Self" (from America Is Dying Slowly)
1996: "Why You Wanna Funk?" (from High School High)
1997: "West Riden" (from the Ant Banks album Big Thangs)
1997: "Function" (from the Da' Unda' Dogg album Fresh Out Da' Gates - The Autobiography)
1997: "Don't Stop" (from the Seagram album Souls on Ice)
1997: "I'm Losin' It" (from the 2Pac album R U Still Down? (Remember Me))
1997: "Fac Not Fiction", "All Head No Body" (from the 187 Fac album Fac Not Fiction)
1998: "        ", "Salt Shaka" (from the 2 One One album 2 One One in Progress)
1998: "I Can't Turn Back" (from Cellblock Compilation, Vol. 2: Face/Off)
1998: "Don't Wait" (from the Devin the Dude album The Dude)
1998: "360°" (from the Eightball album Lost)
1998: "Mob On", "Heat" (from the Paris album Unleashed)
1999: "Section 11350" (from the Kokane album They Call Me Mr. Kane)
1999: "Wet Party" (from the Tear Da Club Up Thugs album CrazyNDaLazDayz)
1999: "Shook Niggas" (from the T.W.D.Y. album Derty Werk)
1999: "49 To The Yay" (from the Without Warning album Without Warning)
1999: "Killa Foe My Skrilla" (from the Arapahoe TRUES album Original Rhythm &           Hip Hop)
2000: "AK Spray" (from the Flesh-N-Bone album From Cleveland 2 Cali)
2000: "Smash" (from the Outlawz album Ride Wit Us or Collide Wit Us)
2000: "Who Got the Keys?" (from the Low Life Mafia album Riding Deep & Dirty)
2000: "U Better Get Ready" (from the Black Mophia Clan album Heat From The Streets Of Roe)
2000: "Hustlers Dream" (from Blood and Tears Soundtrack)
2000: "In Yo' Look" (from the Sean T album Heated)
2000: "Wig Split" (from the DenGee album DenGee Livin')
2001: "The Payback" (from the 187 album Furious)
2003: "Game" (from the 40 Glocc album The Jakal)
2003: "Tha Next" (from the Mastamind album Street Valu)
2004: "In the Ghetto" (from the Trae album Losing Composure)
2004: "Some Girls Deserve To Die" (from Mars Unreleased album)
2005: "Second Time Around" (from the Mars album Mars Attacks)
2006: "The New West" (from the Playalitical album Code Green: Operation Take Over)
2006: "Public Enemy No. 1" (from the Timz album Open for Business)
2007: "Staying Alive", "Murder'Ra" (from the Z-Ro album King Of Tha Ghetto: Power)
2007: "Start a Problem", "Tell Me What U Want" (from the Daz Dillinger album Gangsta Party)
2007: "My Heat Go..." (from the Tito B album Starz The Limit)
2008: "Street Life" (from the Grave Plott album The Plott Thickens)
2008: "No Thang" (from the Kung Fu Vampire album Dead Sexy)
2008: "All Day (Sonofsam Remix)" (from the 2Pac mixtape The Way He Wanted It Vol. 4) 
2009: "6 Ways from Sunday" (from the Killa C album Bound In Chains)
2009: "We Murderaz" (from Fury album Plan B)
2010: "Reactivated" (from Bossolo album The Birth) 
2011: "The Game Needs Me" (from Suga T album The Best Is Yet To Come)
2012: "The Other Day Ago" (from E-40 album The Block Brochure: Welcome to the Soil 2)
2013: "AmeriCanadian Dream" (from Young Noble & Deuce Deuce album Fast Life)
2013: "Underground All-Stars (The Anthem)" (from the Bloodstepp album Bass And Bubblegum)
2014: "Underground MVP" (from the Bloodstepp album Grand Theft Ufo: Floppy Disk Edition)
2014: "Lyrical Homicide" (from Bossolo album The Rebirth of Bossolo Revival)

References

Hip hop discographies
Discographies of American artists